Sabaki may refer to:

Athi-Galana-Sabaki River, or Sabaki River, a river in Kenya
Sabaki languages, languages of the Swahili Coast, named for the Sabaki River
List_of_Go_terms#Sabaki, Sabaki, a term of art in the board game go
Shogi strategy#Sabaki, Sabaki, a term of art the board game shogi
Tai sabaki, term from Japanese martial arts